Pentila bennetti is a butterfly in the family Lycaenidae. It is found in Guinea. The habitat consists of forests.

References

Butterflies described in 2003
Poritiinae
Endemic fauna of Guinea
Butterflies of Africa